McGuirk Arena, previously known as the Daniel P. Rose Center and Rose Arena, is a multi-purpose arena, in Mount Pleasant, Michigan, United States. The arena opened in 1973 and is part of a larger facility known as the CMU Events Center.  The arena is home to the Central Michigan University Chippewas men's and women's basketball, women's gymnastics, women's volleyball, and men's wrestling teams.

Amenities
The facility features a pair of club rooms, the largest of which is a  space with room for 130 Chippewa fans and plush leather-chair seating for 88. It also features a  outdoor patio and is available for receptions, meetings and banquet

History
Ryan Hall/Rose Arena took over as the main hub for Central Michigan's indoor athletic events in 1973 in part of the project to move the athletic events to the south end of campus. Prior to its opening, the main gymnasium was Finch Fieldhouse, itself built in 1951 on South Franklin Street to replace the original Central Hall on Warriner Mall.  Previous seating capacity was 5,200.

Toilet Paper tradition
Prior to 1988, fans would throw toilet paper after a CMU men's basketball player made the first basket.  It was estimated that 3,000 rolls were used each game, causing a shortage.  Fans would even steal paper from the bathrooms.  The Mid-American Conference began assessing technical fouls in 1988 for stopping play and putting the players at risk, thus ending the tradition.

Renovation
In 2009–2010, the CMU Events Center underwent a $20 million renovation that included reconfigured seating in the arena, increasing seating capacity to 5,300 from the previous capacity of 5,200. The Daniel P. Rose Center would become McGuirk Arena with the court naming rights to John Kulhavi. The record attendance for McGuirk Arena of 5,412 was set on February 3, 2017, when the Chippewas Men's Basketball Team came back from an 18 point deficit in the second half to defeat their in-state rival, Western Michigan by a score of 86-82.

Mascot
Rowdie was introduced as the arena's official mascot after the men's basketball team made a trip to the NCAA Men's Basketball tournament in 2003.  Rowdie, named after the "Rose Rowdies" student section at that time, has since hosted numerous events supporting various causes.  In 2008 Rowdie hosted a basketball game featuring mascots from around Mid-Michigan including Sparty from Michigan State.

Notable athletes

Retired numbers
 Dan Majerle #44 (men's basketball)
 Sue Nissen #22 (women's basketball)
 Dan Roundfield #32 (men's basketball)
 James McElroy #14 (men's basketball)
 Mel McLaughlin #14 (men's basketball)
 Ben Poquette #50 (men's basketball)

NBA/ABA players
 Nate Huffman
 Willie Iverson
 Chris Kaman
 Ben Kelso
 Dan Majerle
 Jim McElroy
 Ben Poquette
 Dan Roundfield

See also
 List of NCAA Division I basketball arenas

References

External links
Central Michigan Athletic Facilities

Central Michigan Chippewas basketball
College basketball venues in the United States
College gymnastics venues in the United States
College volleyball venues in the United States
College wrestling venues in the United States
Basketball venues in Michigan
Sports venues completed in 1973
1973 establishments in Michigan